Leo Burnett Kreasindo Indonesia, or also known as Leo Burnett Group Indonesia  is the Indonesian office of Leo Burnett Worldwide. It is an advertising agency with expertise in advertising, digital, social media, reputation management shopper and retail marketing, activation and direct marketing.

Overview 
Leo Burnett Worldwide solidified their relationship with an Indonesian advertising agency PT. Kreasindo Ciptapariwara in 2000 to establish Leo Burnett Kreasindo Indonesia. The Company is currently under the name of PT. Star Reachers Indonesia. Its main office is located in Menara Thamrin, Central Jakarta

Notable Clients 
Among their clients are:
 McDonald's 
 Coca-Cola 
 Procter & Gamble
 Samsung 
 Philip Morris
 Telkomsel

Awards 
Recent awards:
 Bronze winner of Spikes Asia 2013  in Singapore for "Holding Hands" TV Commercial.
 Grand Prix winner in the category Collateral & POS  for the video "Small Currency" at the International Food & Beverage Awards 2013.

Previous awards:
 Silver Winner at the CLIO Awards 2005 for Jordan Dental Floss "Broccoli".

References

External links 
 Leo Burnett Group Indonesia Official Website
 Leo Burnett Worldwide Official Website
 Sample of Leo Burnett Kreasindo Indonesia Advertisement